The Tennessee Language Center (TLC), formerly known as the Tennessee Foreign Language Institute (TFLI), is an agency of the University of Tennessee's Institute for Public Service. Originally created as an agency of the State of Tennessee in 1986, TLC provides language classes, language teacher training and certification, and interpretation and translation services.

TLC (formerly TFLI) was created by the Tennessee General Assembly in 1986 to promote the learning and teaching of foreign languages.
 It is the only state-government-supported organization of its kind.

TLC, which is located in Nashville, has four major departments: English as a Second Language, World Languages, Curriculum and Training, and Interpretation and Translation Services.

Governance
The legislation that established TLC (formerly TFLI) (Tennessee Code Annotated 49-50-1303) called for its governing board to consist of the state commissioners of economic and community development and tourist development or their designees; the commissioner of education; the chancellor of the state university and community college system or a designee; the President of the University of Tennessee or a designee; the executive director of the Tennessee Higher Education Commission; and three other persons appointed by the Governor.

Purpose
The official goals of the Tennessee Language Center can be found in the legislative mandate in the Tennessee Code Annotated. The legislation outlines the purposes of TLC, "which shall include, but not be limited to, the following:

 Coordination and provision of foreign language skills needed by state government for purposes of industrial recruitment, tourist development or any other state purpose; 
 Original research into the most effective methods of foreign language instruction and the dissemination of such knowledge; 
 Improvement of the language skills and teaching methods of foreign language instructors at all levels in the schools, colleges and universities of Tennessee;  and 
 Coordination and provision of foreign language instruction to the citizens of Tennessee."

Finances
Fees for services are a major source of funding for TLC. State appropriations, which totaled $349,100 in 2009-10, provide about 20% of its budget. Additional funds come from grants and donations.

Sources 
 Cabbies' English skills targeted, Tennessean, The (Nashville, TN) - March 10, 2008
 News of note in Williamson County, Tennessean, The (Nashville, TN) - September 17, 2007
 People in business, Tennessean, The (Nashville, TN) - September 9, 2007
 Push for English-only driver's test stirs debate, Greenville (SC) News, The - July 30, 2007
 EXECUTIVE Q&A. DAVID BEREZOV, Tennessean, The (Nashville, TN) - June 10, 2007
 Immersion programs: Local opportunities, Tennessean, The (Nashville, TN) - February 6, 2007
 Starbucks brewing at MetroCenter, Tennessean, The (Nashville, TN) - August 4, 2006
 PEOPLE IN BUSINESS, Tennessean, The (Nashville, TN) - July 23, 2006
 EDUCATION NOTEBOOK, Tennessean, The (Nashville, TN) - July 3, 2006
 PEOPLE IN BUSINESS, Tennessean, The (Nashville, TN) - June 11, 2006

References

External links
 

English-language education
Language education in the United States
Organizations based in Tennessee
Organizations established in 1986
Foreign Language Institute
1986 establishments in Tennessee